The 2013 Charles Sturt Adelaide International was a professional tennis tournament played on hard courts. It was the first edition of the tournament which was part of the 2013 ATP Challenger Tour. It took place in Adelaide, Australia between 4 and 10 February 2013.

Singles main-draw entrants

Seeds

 1 Rankings are as of January 28, 2013.

Other entrants
The following players received wildcards into the singles main draw:
  Alex Bolt
  Chris Guccione
  Nick Kyrgios
  Dane Propoggia

The following players received entry as a special exempt into the singles main draw:
  Matthew Barton

The following players received entry from the qualifying draw:
  Sean Berman
  Colin Ebelthite
  Ivo Klec
  Michael Venus

Doubles main-draw entrants

Seeds

 1 Rankings are as of January 28, 2013.

Other entrants
The following pairs received wildcards into the doubles main draw:
  Matthew Barton /  Michael Look
  Nick Kyrgios /  Bradley Mousley
  Luke Saville /  Jack Schipanski

Champions

Singles

 Matthew Barton def.  James Ward, 6–2, 6–3

Doubles

 Samuel Groth /  Matt Reid def.  James Duckworth /  Greg Jones, 6–2, 6–4

External links

Charles Sturt Adelaide International
Charles Sturt Adelaide International
Charles Sturt Adelaide International